Joe Perry (born 13 August 1974) is an English professional snooker player from Wisbech, Cambridgeshire. Nicknamed "the Gentleman", Perry climbed the rankings steadily after turning professional in 1992 and reached the Top 16 for the first time in 2002.

His first ranking final came at the 2001 European Open and he had to wait another 13 years for a second which came at the 2014 Wuxi Classic. Perry won his first ranking title at the 2015 Players Championship Grand Final, at the age of 40 and in his 23rd season as a professional. He also won the minor-ranking 2013 Yixing Open and 2015 Xuzhou Open.

Perry reached the final of a Triple Crown tournament for the first time at the Masters in 2017, losing 7–10 to Ronnie O'Sullivan. Perry previously reached the UK Championship semi-finals in 2004 and 2005, and the semi-finals of the World Championship in 2008.

Perry claimed his second ranking title at the 2022 Welsh Open by defeating Judd Trump 9–5 in the final. Aged 47, he became the second-oldest player to win a ranking title, after Ray Reardon, who was aged 50 when he won his final ranking event in 1982.

Perry is a commentator for the BBC.

Career

2001–2005
Perry's breakthrough came when he reached the final of the European Open in 2001. He first reached the quarter-finals of the World Championship in 2004, beating then defending champion Mark Williams 13–11 along the way, also making the tournament's highest break of 145 (which remains Perry's best in competition), before losing to Matthew Stevens. He repeated this run in 2008 when he defeated Graeme Dott and Stuart Bingham, and bettered it by going on to beat Stephen Maguire 13–12 and earn his place in the semi-finals, which he narrowly lost to Ali Carter. Previously, he had also reached the last 16 on his Crucible debut in 1999, beating Steve Davis on the final black in the last 32.

He reached the semi-finals of the UK Championship in both 2004 and 2005. The 2004 defeat was especially notable as Perry had led 8–7 and potted a colour to leave his opponent, David Gray, requiring a snooker – however, Perry's pot had also left him snookered on the final red, which he failed to hit, allowing Gray to clear the table and ultimately win the deciding frame with a total clearance of 139. This run left Perry provisionally fifth in the world, but he failed to win a match in the remaining five tournaments and dropped to 14th at the end of the season as a result. In 2005, he lost to eventual champion Ding Junhui.

2007–2010
In the 2007–08 season, Perry reached two quarter-finals: in the Grand Prix (losing 3–5 to Gerard Greene) and the Welsh Open (with victories over John Parrott 5–2, Peter Ebdon 5–1 and Stuart Bingham 5–2 before Shaun Murphy beat him 5–0), as well as the last 16 of the UK Championship, where he beat Neil Robertson 9–6 after being 3–5 down, before losing 2–9 to Marco Fu. He followed that up by reaching the semi-finals of the world championship, where he was knocked out by Ali Carter 15–17. These results ensured him a return to the prestigious top 16 of the rankings (at No. 12, his highest ranking ever), meaning automatic qualification for major tournaments.
He also finished the 2007/2008 season on another high, by winning the Championship League, to qualify for the Betfred Premier League for 2008. He has said he feels that he is learning to cope with the high pressure of major tournaments, having had more experience over the last season.

Perry opened 2008–09 with three last-sixteen runs, leaving him inside the top eight of the provisional rankings. However he went one better in the 2008 UK Championship beating Ronnie O'Sullivan 9–5 having trailed by 3–5, in one of the best victories of his career. However, he lost 7–9 to Marco Fu in the quarter-finals. In the new year, he suffered a narrow 5–6 loss to O'Sullivan in the Masters; the rest of the season was unspectacular as he failed to win a match in a ranking event. He was unable to repeat his 2008 run in the World Championship, losing 6–10 to an in-form Jamie Cope in the first round. This meant that he finished the season ranked at number 12. In 2009–10 he only reached one quarter-final and consequently slid to 19th in the rankings. In the World Championship he beat Michael Holt in the first round 10–4, and trailed Ali Carter 6–10 before winning five frames in a row to lead 11–10 but lost 11–13.

2011–2013
Perry was a losing finalist in Event 1 (Ronnie O'Sullivan won 4–0) and Event 12 (Stephen Maguire won 4–2) during the minor-ranking 2011/2012 Players Tour Championship series. These results helped him qualify for the Finals as he finished 11th on the Order of Merit. It was at the Finals where Perry had his best run in a ranking event during the 2011–12 season as he beat Fergal O'Brien and Graeme Dott, before being defeated by Neil Robertson 1–4 in the quarter-finals. In the other ranking events during the year he reached the second round three times, culminating in a 7–13 defeat to Maguire in the World Championship. Perry finished the season ranked world number 24. He began the 2012–13 season by reaching the second round of the Wuxi Classic thanks to the withdrawal of Matthew Stevens and lost 4–5 to Ricky Walden. He was beaten 1–5 by Marco Fu in the first round of the Australian Goldfields Open, before recording his best result of the year at the Shanghai Masters. He beat Barry Pinches in qualifying, Stevens 5–2 in the first round and then whitewashed Neil Robertson 5–0 to make the quarter-finals. There was never a frame between Perry and Mark Williams in their quarter-final, with Perry making a 131 break to force a deciding frame which he lost. He won two more matches in ranking events during the rest of the season, the first being a 4–0 triumph over world number one Mark Selby in the first round of the Welsh Open.

He was knocked out 3–4 by veteran Alan McManus in the subsequent round. The second was in the PTC Finals which Perry had qualified for by finishing 20th on the Order of Merit. He beat Stuart Bingham 4–2, before losing 3–4 to Ben Woollaston. Perry's season ended when he was beaten 3–10 by world number 83 Sam Baird in the final round of World Championship Qualifying. His end of season ranking was world number 20.

First title
In June 2013, Perry won the first minor-ranking title of his 22-year professional career at the opening event of the Players Tour Championship, the Yixing Open, with a 4–1 defeat of Mark Selby in the final. A week later, he outplayed Ding Junhui in the second round of the Wuxi Classic to win 5–1 and then beat David Gilbert 5–2 in the following round, before being defeated 2–5 by John Higgins in the quarter-finals. Another quarter-final followed at the Australian Goldfields Open, where he was eliminated 2–5 by home favourite Neil Robertson.

Perry won a quarter-final at the third time of asking this season at the International Championship with a 6–1 victory over Ryan Day. His semi-final match against Marco Fu was extremely close and involved long spells of tactical play, as many frames lasted 40 minutes, which Fu edged 9–8 on the colours. He also participated in the 2013 World Games in Cali, Colombia, where he represented the UK. He won his first game against Brendan O'Donoghue but subsequently lost in the quarter-finals to eventual gold medalist Aditya Mehta.

Perry's good play continued into 2014 as he advanced to the quarter-finals of the German Masters with the loss of just three frames, but he then lost 2–5 to Ding Junhui. He secured an impressive 5–1 win over Selby in the quarter-finals of the Welsh Open, stating that his newfound casual approach to the game was a key reason for his successful season. However, it was Ding who once again halted his run in a ranking event as he beat Perry 6–4. A sixth quarter-final appearance of the season came at the PTC Finals, but he lost 2–4 to Judd Trump. He fought back from 3–6 down after the opening session of his first round match with Jamie Burnett at the World Championship to win 10–7 and set up a second round clash with reigning champion Ronnie O'Sullivan. Perry started the better of the two as he established a 5–3 lead after the opening session and maintained his two-frame advantage after the second, although he missed a chance in the final frame to be 10–6 ahead. He went on to lead 11–9, before O'Sullivan leveled the match and then made back-to-back century breaks to win 13–11, with Perry remarking afterwards that he had been "blown away by a genius" in the last few frames.

Perry said that if he could maintain his own attitude and mindset he would win his first major ranking title in the future. He ended the campaign as the world number 15, inside the top 16 for the first time in five years.

Major success

At the 2014 Wuxi Classic, Perry dropped just four frames to reach the semi-finals and then beat Martin Gould 6–4 to reach his second career ranking final and the first in 13 years. He played friend and practice partner Neil Robertson and from 6–8 down won three unanswered frames to stand on the edge of his first ranking title, but Robertson then made breaks of 87 and 78 to edge Perry out 10–9. Afterwards, Robertson suggested that Perry's talent should see him become a top 10 player in the future. Perry failed to advance beyond the last 32 in the next four ranking events.

Perry defeated Ding Junhui 6–3 in the first round of the Masters, his first ever win in the tournament, but then lost 4–6 to Mark Allen with both players missing a catalogue of easy balls during the match which Allen described as "a comedy of errors" afterwards. However, less than a week later, Perry won the Xuzhou Open by beating Thepchaiya Un-Nooh 4–1 in the final to claim his second Asian Tour title in as many years.

Perry's form on the PTC circuit saw him seeded seventh for the Grand Final in Bangkok, Thailand. He defeated Ding Junhui 4–1, Anthony McGill 4–3 from 1–3 down, and Michael Holt and Stuart Bingham 4–1 each to reach his third major ranking final and second of the season. He recovered from 0–3 down against Mark Williams to win 4–3 and claim the first major title of his 23-year playing career, in addition to his highest prize earning of £100,000 and a place inside the world's top ten. When Perry finished the season at ninth in the rankings it marked his highest year-end ranking to date.

A pair of 5–3 wins over Jamie Burnett and Robert Milkins helped Perry to the quarter-finals of the 2015 Australian Goldfields Open, where he was on the wrong end of a 5–3 scoreline against John Higgins. His second quarter-final of the 2015–16 season was also against Higgins at the International Championship and he recovered from 0–4 down to make it 3–5, but then lost the next frame. Perry's ranking event title from last season saw him make his debut in the Champion of Champions and he beat Michael White 4–2 to face Higgins in the quarter-finals once again. There was never more than a frame between the two players and Perry came from 4–5 down to triumph 6–5. In the semi-finals he lost 6–4 to Neil Robertson.

After losing 3–6 to Robbie Williams in the second round of the 2015 UK Championship, Perry called his opponent's style and speed of play "a joke". At the Welsh Open he beat Judd Trump 4–3 in the fourth round and Ben Woollaston 5–1 in the quarter-finals to meet Ronnie O'Sullivan in the semi-finals. He made a 139 break during the match, but lost it 3–6. A second major event semi-final soon followed at the World Grand Prix as he conceded just two frames in eliminating Barry Hawkins (Perry's 133 won him the high break prize), Kyren Wilson and Ali Carter. Stuart Bingham was never ahead of Perry until the frame as he squandered a 3–0 lead to be defeated 5–6. In an extremely tight World Championship first round match, he was edged out 9–10 by Wilson.

A 6–2 success over Neil Robertson saw Perry advance to the final of the 2016 World Open, where he lost 8–10 to Ali Carter. He also saw off Robertson 6–2 to reach the quarter-finals of the International Championship and was defeated 3–6 by Mark Selby. Perry was knocked out 2–6 by Matthew Stevens in the third round of the UK Championship.

At the 2017 Masters a pair of 6–1 victories over Stuart Bingham and Ding Junhui saw Perry play in the semi-finals of the event for the first time. He was 2–5 behind Barry Hawkins and needed a snooker in the next frame, but managed to get it and take the frame. The tie went to a deciding frame in which Perry was 50 points down, but he stepped in to make a break of 70 and reach the final of a Triple Crown tournament for the first time. He said his plan for the final was to get in front of Ronnie O'Sullivan and stay in front of him and he started well by leading 4–1. However, O'Sullivan then reeled off a match defining seven frames in a row and went on to win 10–7. Afterwards, Perry said he had failed to handle the pressure of having a lead in such a big match. He lost 3–4 in the quarter-finals of the World Grand Prix to Liang Wenbo and could not qualify for the World Championship as, after coming back from 6–9 down, he was defeated 9–10 by Akani Songsermsawad. 
At the 2018 World Championship, he defeated defending champion Mark Selby 10–4 in the first round.

Perry claimed his second ranking title at the 2022 Welsh Open by defeating Judd Trump 9–5 in the final. He called winning the tournament "the absolute highlight of my career by a country mile." Aged 47, he became the second-oldest player to win a ranking title, after Ray Reardon, who was aged 50 when he won his final ranking event in 1982.

Personal life 
Perry suffers from ankylosing spondylitis. Before it was correctly diagnosed, he was considering giving up the sport: "I told my wife I was thinking about packing it in because I couldn’t take it any more. I felt there was no point me flying overseas then not being able to even practise, and losing matches."

Perry is a supporter of Arsenal F.C.

Performance and rankings timeline

Career finals

Ranking finals: 6 (2 titles)

Minor-ranking finals: 4 (2 titles)

Non-ranking finals: 3 (2 titles)

Pro-am finals: 5 (4 titles)

Team finals: 8 (5 titles)

References

External links

Joe Perry at worldsnooker.com

1974 births
English snooker players
People from Wisbech
Living people
Competitors at the 2013 World Games